Gomukh, also known as "Gaumukh" or "Gomukhi" (Hindi: गौमुख or गौमुखी ; Assamese and Bengali: গোমুখ or গোমুখী), is the terminus or pout of the Gangotri Glacier and the source of the Bhagirathi River, one of the primary headstreams of the Ganga River. The word Gomukh/Gaumukh (go/gau=cow, mukh= mouth) literally means "Mouth of a Cow."

The place is situated at a height of 13,200 ft (4,023 m) in the Uttarkashi district in the state of Uttarakhand, India. It is one of the largest in the Himalayas with an estimated volume of over 27 cubic kilometers.

It is a holy Hindu pilgrimage site, visited by many who visit Gangotri. It is around 20km away from Gangotri and can be reached by trekking.

In 1972, Sir Seewoosagur Ramgoolam the then Prime Minister of Mauritius, brought the holy Ganga water from Gomukh and mixed it with the water of Grand Bassin in Mauritius and renamed it as Ganga Talao for the Mauritian Hindus.

In ancient times

Gomukh is mentioned in the Puranas. It is said there that, searching a lost sheep,  a boy reached near a glacier in Gangotri, the snout of which exactly looked like the face of a Cow, and thus it got its name 'Gomukh' . From then many holy saints, sages, sadhus, hermits, adventure seekers, as well as religious people and adventure seekers also went there to worship the place. It is also rumored that, if anyone visits Gomukh / Gawmukh with evil intentions or polluted body or mind, his ancestors fall in Burning Hell and that person experiences grave horrors and deep melancholy surrounds him.

Geography 

Gomukh is 18 km from Gangotri in the foothills of Bhagirathi at a height of 4255m. It is the snout of the Gangotri Glacier. The Bhagirathi river here is pretty speedy.

Around the snout, nature presents a wild topography. There are boulders scattered here and there with some pieces of broken snow, along with the hard clayey snow of the glacier.

The Gomukh snout is rapidly moving backwards. According to the modern research the snout has moved 1 km in just 70 years.

Trek route 

The first and foremost thing for Gomukh trek is that you must have permission from (D.F.O.) District forest officer, Uttarkashi. Only 150 permits are issued per day, permission can be taken via fax also. It was heavily damaged by rockslides by the 2013 North Indian Floods as was road access to Gangotri.

9 km ahead of Gangotri is Chirbasa, the abode of Chir trees. After 3 km of Chirbasa comes the dangerous Gila Pahar, the place well known for its landslides even prior to the 2013 destruction of much of the trail here; near-sheer cliffs down to the river must now be traversed. Here the Bharals, a type of mountain antelope, are sometimes seen. The Bharals are found above the altitude of 10,000 ft. Only 4 km from here is Bhujbasa, the only night halting place on the way with buildings. One can stay at the GMVN Bungalow, or at the Lalbaba's Ashram or at Ram Baba's ashram. After trekking 41/2km from Bhujbasa, one reaches Gomukh, the snout of the Gangotri Glacier.A little before Gomukh, the majestic view of Mt. Shivling welcomes the trekkers to the place.

On the trail no horses are allowed, so one must take preparations to walk on foot.
The trek to Tapovan and Nandanvan starts from here.

The route after 'Bhojbasa' can be quite difficult, more so since the 2013 floods. One has to cross a boulder zone to reach the Gomukh snout.

The trek beyond Gomukh is quite difficult. Crossing the glacier and going towards Tapovan has become quite dangerous nowadays because of the landslides. There is no track and one must have a guide and should be prepared to face any type of accident which can even be a life-threatening one. The last climb to reach Tapovan is very stiff, within 2 km a climb of around 1500 foot and is quite a challenging experience.

You may apply for  an online permit, even with an online permit you would still need to get it verified at the district magistrate uttrakasi office.

References

Glaciers of Uttarakhand
Geography of Uttarkashi district
Hindu pilgrimage sites in India